Metrobus is a bus service operated by the Washington Metropolitan Area Transit Authority (WMATA). There are 269 bus routes serving 11,129 stops, including 2,554 bus shelters.

History 

Metrobus was founded on February 4, 1973, after acquiring DC Transit, Washington, Virginia and Maryland Coach Company (WV&M), Alexandria, Barcroft and Washington Transit Company (AB&W) and the Washington Marlboro and Annapolis Motor Lines (WM&A) to combine into Metrobus. During its founding, WMATA dropped transfer charges, extended senior citizen discounts region-wide and began fare reductions on routes formerly served by the different carriers at different rates. WMATA also unified a new bus livery with red, white and blue paint scheme and purchased 620 buses from AM General with the last buses being delivered in 1974. Today, Metrobus serves the nation's capital 24/7, with over 1,500 buses.

Fares 

, the Metrobus fare structure is as follows for cash and SmarTrip:

 Local bus routes within the District of Columbia, Central Maryland and Northern Virginia: $2.00
 Express bus routes (17B, 17G, 17K, 17L, 17M, 18G, and 18P): $4.25
 Express Airport bus routes (5A and B30): $7.50

Discounts are available for senior citizens, people with disabilities and D.C. students.

Up to two children, per paying adult, under 5 years of age ride for free. Children at least 5 years of age pay adult fare.

All Metrobuses have SmarTrip card readers which automatically deduct the correct fare from a rider's SmarTrip card (including transfer credit).

Metrobus issued paper transfers until January 4, 2009. Transfers are now currently attainable only through SmarTrip cards.

On June 27, 2010, the transfer window was reduced from 3 hours to 2 hours.

All fares were free from mid-March 2020 to January 3, 2021, due to the COVID-19 pandemic. On December 6, 2022, the Council of the District of Columbia voted to abolish fares within city limits from July 1, 2023.

Fleet 

On July 4, 2018, WMATA awarded a 5-year contract to New Flyer for up to 694 buses, order consist of forty-foot CNG, forty-foot clean diesel, sixty-foot CNG, and sixty-foot diesel heavy-duty transit buses. These new buses will replace Metro's older New Flyer Low Floor buses, which were delivered between 2005 and 2007. Red/Silver painted buses will be used on local routes and Blue/Silver buses will be used on limited stop routes. These buses will have either Local or MetroExtra on the top of each side of the bus for easy identification.

WMATA is adding a total of 533 hybrid buses to replace its diesel bus fleet. Each new "New Flyer Xcelsior XDE40" bus costs $571,737 and is expected to break down less frequently as well as offer greater fuel economy. With the latest purchase of 152 hybrid buses for $89.3 million from New Flyer of America, WMATA's Metrobus fleet will consist of 297 diesel buses, 800 hybrid buses and 458 natural gas fueled buses. Additionally, WMATA placed an order for 110 new buses from New Flyer on September 18, 2019.

According to a Sierra Club report, in 2020 WMATA received $4.1 million in funding from the Federal Transit Administration for the purchase of electric buses and charging infrastructure. The report estimated that 50% electrification would reduce the WMATA fleet's greenhouse gas (GHG) emissions by more than 58,000 tons of carbon dioxide (CO2) per year.

Divisions 

There are 9 divisions (a.k.a. depots) in the Metrobus system.

Closed depots

Routes

Numbering 
Most Metrobus routes follow the rules below:
 Metrobus routes in Washington, D.C. have either a two digit number (31, 42, 64, etc.) or a letter followed by a number (A2, S2, X8, etc.)
 Metrobus routes in Montgomery County, MD have a letter followed by a number (C4, Q4, Z6, etc.)
 Metrobus routes in Prince George's County, MD have a letter followed by two numbers (F12, J12, P12, etc.)
 Metrobus routes in Northern Virginia have one or two numbers followed by a letter (1A, 16C, 29N, etc.)

Odd-numbered routes are typically part-time variants of even-numbered routes.

Richmond Highway Express 

Richmond Highway Express, a.k.a. "REX", is a Limited-Stop bus line that operates between King Street–Old Town station and Fort Belvoir along the Richmond Highway corridor in Fairfax County, Virginia. All REX runs take place on board on any local bus from Cinder Bed Division. The original REX bus fleet consisted of 12 now-retired 2000 Orion 06.501 (VI) buses wrapped (but not painted) in the blue-and-gold color scheme (2073–2084) before the aforementioned Orion 07.501 CNG buses arrived in 2006. The second REX fleet consisted of 12 now-retired 2006 Orion 07.501 (VII) CNG buses (2674–2685) painted in the blue-and-gold color scheme until they were all repainted between June and August 2014. The third REX fleet were consisted of 12 2010 New Flyer DE40LFA diesel-electric hybrid buses (6550–6561) painted in the blue-and-gold color scheme before being repainted from June 2018 back into the Red Local Scheme due to the units being rehabilitated. The fourth and most recent REX fleet consisted of 12 2008 New Flyer DE40LFA buses painted in the blue-and-gold color scheme. The entire REX fleet has been retired as of December 26, 2021; from that date onward, the REX route has been operated entirely with regular Metrobuses.

MetroExtra 

MetroExtra is a limited-stop Metrobus service, which operates on Metrobus lines that need extra service with faster trips.

Metroway 

Metroway is a bus rapid transit (BRT) service that began on August 24, 2014. The first phase is the Crystal City/Potomac Yard Transitway, which operates on Route 1 in Arlington and Alexandria, Virginia. The first 0.8 mile segment in Alexandria runs on a transit lane only. The Arlington County segment began construction in the summer of 2014 and opened April 17, 2016. Metroway originally operated between the Braddock Road and  stations and was expanded to Pentagon City in April 2016. Thirteen 2016 New Flyer Xcelsior XN40 CNG buses (2981–2993) operate with the blue-and-white Metroway livery. The original Metroway fleet consisted of thirteen 2014 NABI 42 BRT diesel-electric hybrid buses (8002–8014) until they were all repainted in December 2016. The Metroway service, which is operated by Metrobus' Four Mile Run bus division, features dedicated bus lanes, transit signal priority, real-time information, custom designed shelters and stations, as well as near-level boarding at station platforms. A Metroway fare costs the same as Metrobus, which is $2.00 (using cash & SmarTrip).

See also 

 List of Metrobus routes (Washington, D.C.)
 Metrobus fleet (Washington, D.C.)
 Metro Transit Police Department

References 

 
1967 establishments in Washington, D.C.
Bus transportation in Washington, D.C.
Bus transportation in Maryland
Bus transportation in Virginia